Language ombudsman or language commissioner may refer to:

David Bazay, Canadian journalist for the CBC and later the English language ombudsman
Keith Spicer, national "language ombudsman" for French and English language rights
An Coimisinéir Teanga, Irish language commissioner
Welsh Language Commissioner
Language ombudsman (Ukraine), an official position to enforce the Ukrainian language policy
Office of the Commissioner of Official Languages, Canada
Dzongkha Development Commission, or Official Language Commission, Bhutan
 Commissioner of Official Languages (disambiguation)

See also

Language police (disambiguation)
 Office québécois de la langue française, Quebec, Canada
Superior Council of the French Language (disambiguation)

Language policy
Government occupations